Assam Talks is an Indian Assamese-language news channel based in Guwahati. It is owned by Rockland Media and Communication Pvt Ltd.

Programs 
 Prime Daily
 Record Kebol Record
 Suparbhat
 Supoti Returns
 Rapid Fire Breakfree
 Offbeat
 Kene Ase Teolok
 Sharp Cut with Rubul Das

See also
 List of Assamese-language television channels

References

External links

Assamese-language television channels
Assamese-language mass media
Television channels and stations established in 2005
Television stations in Guwahati